Sonia Garmers (born 9 January 1933) is a writer from Curaçao.

Career 

Garmers has written various books both in Papiamento and in Dutch. Garmers published her first book in Papiamento in 1955. Her first book written in Dutch Lieve koningin, hierbij stuur ik U mijn dochter ("Dear Queen, I hereby send you my daughter") was published in 1976. This book addresses Juliana of the Netherlands, who was Queen of the Netherlands at the time, with regard to Garmers sending each of her four daughters to the Netherlands for study. This, coincidentally, is the same number of daughters as Juliana. Juliana also received a copy of the book.

Garmers first met Miep Diekmann in 1958. Diekmann started coaching Garmers and taught her, among other things, how to best structure a book. Diekmann coached Garmers when she was writing her first Dutch book Lieve koningin, hierbij stuur ik U mijn dochter (1976).

In 1973, she published a collection of poems in collaboration with Nydia Ecury and Mila Palm.

In 1981, she won the Nienke van Hichtum-prijs for her book Orkaan en Mayra (1980). The book is a sequel to her first Dutch language children's book Orkaan which was published in 1977 and illustrated by Thé Tjong-Khing.

In 1983, she won the Cola Debrotprijs for her contributions to literature.

Awards 
 1981: Nienke van Hichtum-prijs, Orkaan en Mayra
 1983: Cola Debrotprijs

References

External links 

 Sonia Garmers (in Dutch), Digital Library for Dutch Literature
 Sonia Garmers (in Dutch), jeugdliteratuur.org

1933 births
Living people
Curaçao writers
Curaçao women children's writers
20th-century women writers
Papiamento-language writers
Nienke van Hichtum Prize winners